Marsupial moles, the Notoryctidae , are highly specialized marsupial mammals, known from two species found at the Australian interior. 
 Notoryctes typhlops (southern marsupial mole, known as the itjaritjari by the Pitjantjatjara and Yankunytjatjara people in Central Australia).
 Notoryctes caurinus (northern marsupial mole, also known as the kakarratul)
Notoryctids are small, fossorial mammals that anatomically converge on other fossorial (and distantly related) mammals, such as living golden moles (Chrysochloridae) and extinct epoicotheres (Pholidota).

Characteristics
In an example of convergent evolution, notoryctids resemble (and fill the ecological niche of) moles from North America and Eurasia and golden moles from Southern Africa. Like chrysochlorids and epoicotheres, notoryctids use their forelimbs and enlarged central claws to dig in a parasagittal (i.e., up and down) plane, as opposed to the "lateral scratch" style of digging that characterizes talpid moles. 

Marsupial moles spend most of their time underground, coming to the surface only occasionally, probably mostly after rains. They are functionally blind, their eyes having become reduced to vestigial lenses under the skin which lack a pupil. They have no external ears, just a pair of tiny holes hidden under thick hair. The head is cone-shaped, with a leathery shield over the muzzle, the body is tubular, and the tail is a short, bald stub encased in leathery skin. Their pouch is small but well developed and has evolved to face backwards so it does not fill with sand. It contains just two teats, so the animal cannot support more than two young at a time.

The limbs are very short, with reduced digits. The forefeet have two greatly enlarged, spade shaped, flat claws on the third and fourth digits, which are used to excavate soil in front of the animal. The hindfeet are flattened, and bear three small claws; these feet are used to push soil behind the animal as it digs. Epipubic bones are present but small and as in some other fossorial mammals (e.g., armadillos), the last five cervical vertebrae are fused to give the head greater rigidity during digging. The animal swims through the soil and doesn't leave behind any permanent burrow.

The teeth of the marsupial moles are degenerate and bear no resemblance to polyprotodont or diprotodont teeth. Their dental formula varies, but is usually somewhere near  . The upper molar teeth are triangular and zalambdodont, i.e., resembling an inverted Greek letter lambda in occlusal view, and the lower molars appear to have lost their talonid basins.

Fossil record
Notoryctids are represented by early Miocene fossils of Naraboryctes from Riversleigh in Queensland, Australia, which document the mosaic acquisition of dental and skeletal features of the living Notoryctes from a more surface-dwelling ancestor.
The notoryctid fossil record demonstrates that the primary cusp of the molars is the metacone, distinct from the paracone characteristic of zalambdodont tenrecs, golden moles, and Solenodon. Regarding the number of teeth in each dental quadrant (or dental formula) Archer et al. (2011) reported that "the dental formula for species of Notoryctes is controversial because of considerable polymorphism in tooth number, both between specimens and within the same specimen." Nonetheless, reflecting the consensus of older studies, Archer et al. (2011) report the presence of four molars (typical for marsupials) in each quadrant both in living Notoryctes and the fossil notoryctid Naraboryctes.

Evolutionary affinities
American paleontologist William King Gregory wrote in 1910 (p. 209) that "Notoryctes is a true marsupial" and this view has been repeatedly verified by phylogenetic analyses of comparative anatomy, mitochondrial DNA, nuclear DNA, rare genomic events, and combined datasets of nuclear and mitochondrial DNA and morphology and DNA. The largest phylogenetic datasets strongly support the placement of Notoryctes as the sister taxon to a dasyuromorph-peramelian clade, within the Australidelphian radiation.

References

 University of Western Australia marsupial mole home page
 Research mission to discover conservation requirements (includes photo)
 Nature news story (includes photo)
 AusEmade: Marsupial Mole Information
 Archer, Hand & Godthelp, Australia's lost world: Riversleigh, World Heritage Site, Reed New Holland, 1991. 
 [http://animaldiversity.org/accounts/Notoryctes_caurinus/

External links
ARKive - images and movies of the marsupial mole (Notoryctes typhlops)
Australian Geographic -  The marsupial mole: an enduring enigma

Notoryctidae
Mammals of Western Australia
Extant Burdigalian first appearances